Homoneura unguiculata is a species of fly in the family Lauxaniidae.

References

Lauxaniidae
Insects described in 1913